William Willsher (12 October 1814 (baptised) – 30 November 1861) was an English cricketer who played for Kent County Cricket Club.

Willsher made a single first-class appearance for the team, during the 1847 season, against Surrey. From the tailend, he scored a duck in each innings in which he batted.

References

1814 births
1861 deaths
English cricketers
Kent cricketers